The Ultimate Tag League is a professional wrestling round-robin tag team tournament held by DDT Pro-Wrestling. In 2021, the tournament was brought back 16 years after the previous edition under its current name. 

The Ultimate Tag League is held under a points system, with 2 points for a win, 1 for a draw, and 0 for a loss. From 2000 to 2003, wins by pinfall, submission or knockout were awarded 3 points and wins via countout or disqualification were only worth 2 points. Number of entrants and formats have changed over the years, with up to three blocks of participants and the occasional inclusion of semifinals. Matches in the DDT/KO-D Tag League had a 20-minute time limit. The Ultimate Tag League matches have a 30-minute time limit.

List of winners

Results

2000
The 2000 DDT Tag League featured two blocks of three teams and ran from August 24 to September 14.

2001
The 2001 KO-D Tag League ran from August 25 to September 30 and saw eight teams compete in a single block, with the top two scoring teams advancing to a final. On August 16, Mikami and Super Uchuu Power vacated the KO-D Tag Team Championship and put the titles on the line in the tournament.

2002
The 2002 KO-D Tag League ran from July 13 to August 25 and saw eight teams compete in a single block. On May 16, Mikami had to vacate the KO-D Tag Team Championship due to an injury. It  was then decided than the tournament would crown new champions. Due to a four-way tie for first place, the four teams were paired in the semifinals, with the two winners facing off in the final. Tomohiko Hashimoto suffered an injury after one match. He was temporarily replaced by JPWA Lion #1 for one match and then permanently replaced by Seiya Morohashi for the remaining matches. Morohashi suffered a mild injury too and also had to forfeit a match.

2003
The 2003 KO-D Tag League was held from September 11 to September 28 and featured two blocks of five teams. On the first day of the tournament, the KO-D Tag Team Champions Takashi Sasaki and Thanomsak Toba lost their match against Super Uchuu Power and Super Uchuu Power Omega. They decided to vacate the titles in order to put them up for grab in the tournament.

2004
The 2004 KO-D Tag League was held from September 16 to September 30 and featured three blocks of four teams. The points system was changed to a more traditional system of 2 points for a victory and 1 point for a draw. The winners would also win the vacant KO-D Tag Team Championship.

2005
The 2005 KO-D Tag League featured two blocks of four teams and ran from September 10 to September 23. Toru Owashi was forced to drop out of the tournament after his first match and forfeited his remaining matches. Due to a three-way tie for first place in block B, the three teams faced off in a three-way decision match, with the winners advancing to the final.

2021
The Ultimate Tag League 2021 ran from May 9 to May 27 and featured five teams competing in a single block with the team scoring the most points to be declared the winners. Due to a tie, the top two scoring teams faced off in a tie-breaker. The time limit for the matches was increased from 20 minutes to 30 minutes.

2022
The 2022 Ultimate Tag League ran from January 30 to February 27. This edition featured ten teams competing in two blocks. On January 3, Harashima and Naomi Yoshimura vacated the KO-D Tag Team Championship so it could be put up for grab in the tournament. Danshoku "Dandy" Dino was originally scheduled to represent Pheromones but had to be pulled off the tournament when he was diagnosed with COVID-19 symptoms days before the start. He was replaced by Yumehito "Fantastic" Imanari. CDK, the team of Chris Brookes and Masa Takanashi, had to forfeit multiples matches due to various medical reasons.

See also
Global Tag League
World Tag League
World's Strongest Tag League
DDT Pro-Wrestling
Professional wrestling in Japan

References

Notes

Footnotes

External links

Wrestle Universe

DDT Pro-Wrestling
Tag team tournaments